Al-Sulaikh SC is an Iraqi football team based in Baghdad, that plays in Iraq Division one.

History

in Premier League
The team played in the Iraqi Premier League in 2005–06 season, but relegated to the Iraq Division One after finished the season in 7th place in the Group Stage.

Honours
Iraq Division One
Winner (1): 2004–05 (shared)

Managerial history
  Khudhair Abbas 
  Ali Wahab 
  Karim Farhan
  Rashid Sultan  
  Hazim Saleh

Famous players
Mahdi Karim
Mustafa Karim
Essam Yassin

See also
 2002–03 Iraq FA Cup
 2015–16 Iraq FA Cup
 2022–23 Iraq FA Cup

References

External links
 Al-Sulaikh SC on Goalzz.com
 Iraq Clubs- Foundation Dates

Sport in Baghdad
1957 establishments in Iraq
Football clubs in Baghdad